The Omaha, Lincoln and Beatrice Railway , "The Big Red Line", was founded in 1903 as an attempt to carry passengers between the three Nebraska cities. Although it never extended outside Lincoln, the OL&B currently exists as a Class III switching railroad in Lincoln. It has been owned by NEBCO, Inc. since 1929.

Operations 
OL&B loads grain for ADM and Ag Processing Inc, delivers lumber to Lincoln Lumber Company, and interchanges between BNSF and Union Pacific. They also operate a shop for car repairs and provide mobile car repair and track maintenance.

Known customers 
Customers of the railway included:
 Lincoln Lumber Company
 Lincoln Lumber sits on what is left of the Union-Lincoln branch of the Missouri Pacific Railway. It was purchased from Union Pacific around the year 2001. Currently due to the condition of the track, OL&B will only run locomotive #12 down this stretch of track due to weight concerns of their GP 38-3 #47. Lincoln Lumber owns the trackage
 ADM Farmland
 Ag Processing Inc.
 Snyder Industries
 Ready Mixed Concrete Co (owned by parent company NEBCO)

Roster

References

External links
 

Nebraska railroads
Switching and terminal railroads
Interurban railways in Nebraska